MV Edwin H. Gott is a very large diesel-powered lake freighter owned and operated by Great Lakes Fleet, Inc, a subsidiary of Canadian National Railway. This vessel was built in 1979 at Bay Shipbuilding Company, Sturgeon Bay, Wisconsin, and included self-unloading technology.

This is a maximum load of about 74,100 tons. The hatches are significantly smaller than other large lake freighters.

History 
The ship was originally built in 1979 for U.S. Steel and was named for their former chairman and chief executive officer, Edwin H. Gott.

These were replaced with two 8-cylinder MaK/Caterpillar 8M43C diesel engines which each produce  and are compliant with EPA emission requirements. The project was partly funded by a $750,000 EPA Clean Diesel grant. MV Edwin H. Gott conducted sea trials of the new engines in March 2011. The ship was repowered at Bay Shipbuilding Company, Sturgeon Bay, Wisconsin, during the winter of 2010/2011.

When the ship was originally built, it was fitted with a shuttle boom that could extend  to either side of the stern of the vessel. This type of boom limited which ports the vessel could unload, as it required a dockside hopper. In the layup period between the 1995 and 1996 season, the vessel returned to Bay Shipbuilding Company, Sturgeon Bay, Wisconsin, where it was fitted with a traditional unloading boom.

References 

1979 ships
Great Lakes freighters
Ships built in Sturgeon Bay, Wisconsin